Klute is a 1971 film starring Jane Fonda and Donald Sutherland.

Klute may also refer to:
Chris Klute, American soccer player
Klute (musician), a pseudonym for drum and bass producer Tom Withers
Klutæ, an industrial music project formerly known as Klute
Klute shag, a hairstyle based on that of Jane Fonda in the film Klute
The Klute, a pseudonym for performance poet Bernard Schober
The Klute, a character played by Deep Roy in the season 2 episode "Gambit" of Blake's 7
 Klute, a nightclub in Durham, UK
 Klute (crater), a crater on the far side of the Moon

See also
 Clute (disambiguation)